James Emil Coco (March 21, 1930 – February 25, 1987) was an American stage and screen actor. He was the recipient of a Primetime Emmy Award, a Drama Desk Award and three Obie Awards, as well as nominations for a Tony Award, an Academy Award and two Golden Globe Awards. Coco is remembered for his supporting roles in the films Man of La Mancha (1972) and Only When I Laugh (1981).

Early life and career
Born in the Little Italy section of Manhattan, Coco was the son of Felice Lescoco, a shoemaker, and Ida Detestes Lescoco (Coco being a shortened version of his birth name).  

The family moved to the Pelham Bay section of the Bronx when he was an infant, where he lived until his late teens.

James began acting straight out of high school. He received his acting training at HB Studio in New York City. As an overweight and prematurely balding adult, he found himself relegated to character roles. He made his Broadway debut in Hotel Paradiso in 1957, but his first major recognition was for Off-Broadway's The Moon in Yellow River by Denis Johnston, for which he won an Obie Award.

Coco's first modern collaboration with playwright Terrence McNally was a 1968 Off-Broadway double-bill of the one-act plays Sweet Eros and Witness, followed by Here's Where I Belong, a disastrous Broadway musical adaptation of East of Eden that closed on opening night. They had far greater success with their next project, Next, a two-character play with Elaine Shore, which ran for more than 700 performances and won Coco the Drama Desk Award for Outstanding Performance. Sixteen years later, the two would reunite for the Manhattan Theatre Club production of It's Only a Play.

Coco also achieved success with Neil Simon, who wrote The Last of the Red Hot Lovers (1969) specifically for him. It earned him a Tony Award nomination as Best Actor in a Play. The two later joined forces for a Broadway revival of the musical Little Me and the films Murder by Death (1976), The Cheap Detective (1978) and Only When I Laugh (1981), for which he was both Oscar-nominated and Razzie-nominated.

Coco, a veteran of many failed diets, was the author of the bestselling book The James Coco Diet, released on February 1, 1983, which documented his successful experience of the Structure House weight reduction system. However, he outlived the release of his book by only four years.

Film and television roles
Coco's additional film credits include Ensign Pulver (1964), The Patty Duke Show (1965). End of the Road (1970), The Strawberry Statement (1970), Tell Me That You Love Me, Junie Moon (1970), A New Leaf (1971), Such Good Friends (1971), Man of La Mancha (1972), Scavenger Hunt (1979), Wholly Moses! (1980) and The Muppets Take Manhattan (1984) as well as a starring role in The Wild Party (1975).
Charleston (1977) Several of his films were released posthumously: Hunk (1987) and That's Adequate (1989).

On television, Coco starred on two unsuccessful 1970s series, Calucci's Department and The Dumplings, and made guest appearances on many series, including ABC Stage 67, NBC Children’s Theater, The Edge of Night, Marcus Welby, M.D., Trapper John, M.D., Medical Center, Maude, Fantasy Island, Alice, The Eddie Capra Mysteries, Murder, She Wrote, The Muppet Show, The Carol Burnett Show, The Love Boat, $weepstake$, and St. Elsewhere, for which he won an Emmy Award. One of his last television assignments was a recurring role as Nick Milano on the sitcom Who's the Boss?. Coco died exactly one day after what would become his final appearance on Who's the Boss? was first broadcast.

Awards and nominations

Death
Coco died at St. Vincent's Hospital, Manhattan, on February 25, 1987, at age 56 after suffering a heart attack at his Greenwich Village home. He is buried in St. Gertrude's Roman Catholic Cemetery in Colonia, New Jersey.

Works

Filmography
Ensign Pulver (1964) - Skouras
Patty Duke Show (1965) - Director
Generation (1969) - Mr. Blatto
End of the Road (1970) - School Man
The Strawberry Statement (1970) – Grocer
Tell Me That You Love Me, Junie Moon (1970) – Mario
A New Leaf (1971) – Uncle Harry
Such Good Friends (1971) – Timmy
Man of La Mancha (1972) – Sancho Panza / Cervantes's Manservant
VD Blues (1972) – Himself
Calucci's Department (1973) – Joe Calucci
The Wild Party (1975) – Jolly Grimm
Murder by Death (1976) – Milo Perrier
Charleston (1977) – Joe Lo Monaco
Bye Bye Monkey (1978) – Andreas Flaxman
The Cheap Detective (1978) – Marcel
The Muppet Show (1978) - Himself (Special Guest Star)
Scavenger Hunt (1979) – Henri
Wholly Moses! (1980) – Hyssop
Only When I Laugh (1981) – Jimmy Perrino
The Muppets Take Manhattan (1984) – Mr. Skeffington
Johnny Dangerously (1984) – Moronie's Bouncer (uncredited)
The Ray Bradbury Theater (1985) – "Marionettes, Inc." (Season 1, Episode 1), John Braling 
Hunk (1987) – Dr. D
The Chair (1988) – Dr. Harold Woodhouse Langer
That's Adequate (1989) – Max Roebling (final film role)

References

External links
 
 
 
 
 
 

1930 births
1987 deaths
20th-century American male actors
Male actors from New York City
American male film actors
American male stage actors
American male television actors
American people of Italian descent
Burials in New Jersey
Drama Desk Award winners
Obie Award recipients
Outstanding Performance by a Supporting Actor in a Drama Series Primetime Emmy Award winners
People from Greenwich Village
People from the Bronx